Critique of Impure Reason: Horizons of Possibility and Meaning is a book by American philosopher Steven James Bartlett. A study of the limits of knowledge, reference, epistemic possibility, and meaning, it is the most extensive philosophical work by Bartlett to date.

In the book, Bartlett explains that by a "critique of impure reason" is meant a critique of the limitative boundaries beyond which concepts and claims lead to "impure reason," undermining the very conditions of their possible meaning. The central thesis of the book is that many major traditional philosophical problems can be solved in a rationally compelling manner once we recognize and rein in the many ways in which we seek to overstep these limiting boundaries. When we try to trespass beyond these boundaries, which the Critique of Impure Reason calls the "horizons" of reference, we employ concepts and make claims that violate the very conditions that must be granted for them to possess any possible meaning. The book's objective is to understand the unavoidable boundaries of the frameworks we use, and to help us to avoid conceptual confusions that come about when attempts are made to transgress beyond what is possible and meaningful.

Background

Previously published work by Bartlett leading to the Critique of Impure Reason
In the Critique of Impure Reason Bartlett builds on a series of previous publications by him that span a period of more than 50 years. Publications directly allied to the Critique of Impure Reason include:

 Bartlett's doctoral dissertation A Relativistic Theory of Phenomenological Constitution: A Self-referential, Transcendental Approach to Conceptual Pathology. This work presents within a phenomenological framework a logically compelling method that makes it possible to identify and correct conceptual transgressions that are self-undermining. This is the first work in which Bartlett describes the project of a "critique of impure reason."
 Metalogic of Reference: A Study in the Foundations of Possibility, a monograph that translates Bartlett's earlier phenomenological analysis of conceptual transgressions into the more theoretically neutral terms of what he calls the metalogic of reference.
 A group of papers that apply Bartlett's method to identify, correct, and eliminate such conceptual transgressions; these papers include "The Idea of a Metalogic of Reference," "Phenomenology of the Implicit," "Self-reference, Phenomenology, and Philosophy of Science," "Hoisted by Their Own Petards: Philosophical Positions that Self-Destruct," and "Roots of Human Resistance to Animal Rights: Psychological and Conceptual Blocks,"
 "Referential Consistency as a Criterion of Meaning, which develops and formulates Bartlett's self-validating method of analysis using the tools of mathematical logic. Later revised and elaborated in his Critique of Impure Reason.
 Conceptual Therapy: An Introduction to Framework-relative Epistemology, an introductory college text describing Bartlett's self-referential approach to conceptual analysis.
 Self-Reference: Reflections on Reflexivity, a collection, edited by Bartlett and Peter Suber with an Introduction by Bartlett, of invited papers that focus on issues and problems involving self-referential argumentation.
 Reflexivity: A Source Book in Self-Reference, a second collection of papers, edited by Bartlett with an Introduction by him, relating to self-reference.
 Two books in the field of clinical psychology which include applications of Bartlett's epistemological approach to conceptual pathology: The Pathology of Man: A Study of Human Evil and Normality Does Not Equal Mental Health: The Need to Look Elsewhere for Standards of Good Psychological Health.

Relationship to Immanuel Kant's Critique of Pure Reason and to Kant's notion of a "negative science"
Kant's Critique of Pure Reason, published in two editions, in 1781 and 1787, sought to provide a critique of the "faculty of reason in general," and by doing this it attempted to supply an analysis of the preconditions of experience and knowledge. In contradistinction, Bartlett's Critique of Impure Reason seeks to provide a critique of the unavoidable limitations of philosophically fundamental concepts that conflict with the preconditions of possible reference, meaning (philosophy), and knowledge. The latter task is essentially one of identifying, correcting, and eliminating the pervasive variety of conceptual error which it is the book's central purpose to analyze. It is this project which makes the book a critique of "impure reason" –- that is, reason that seeks to trespass beyond the limits of possible reference and meaning.

Bartlett makes clear that the Critique of Impure Reason is neither intended as a commentary on Kant, nor as an elaboration of Kant's approach to philosophy. Instead, Bartlett directs attention to a notion, never developed by Kant but only briefly hinted at by him in a 1770 letter he wrote to Swiss-German philosopher, mathematician, and physicist Johann Heinrich Lambert. In that letter, Kant suggested the need for a "negative science", a "phaenomenologia generalis." To Kant it seemed that such a "negative science" is "presupposed by metaphysics." As Bartlett interprets and develops Kant's briefly sketched notion, a "negative science" would set the general task for itself to avoid conceptual confusions that lead to meaninglessness.

Bartlett stresses the need for and the importance of such a "negative science" in philosophy: As Bartlett develops it, negative science serves as a means to differentiate between what is meaningful and what is meaningless: Specifically, its application would identify, correct, and eliminate the widespread form of conceptual error with which Bartlett is concerned, which he calls "projection" (more technically in the Critique of Impure Reason this is called "metalogical projection"). Such a "negative science" would provide assurance that we employ only concepts, propositions, and statements that do not undermine their very possibility of possessing meaning. Bartlett's Critique of Impure Reason is essentially a treatise that develops such a negative science.

The structure and contents of the Critique of Impure Reason

The structure of the book
The thesis of the Critique of Impure Reason: Horizons of Possibility and Meaning is elaborated in three stages:

In the first stage (Part I: Why Philosophy Has Made No Progress and How It Can), Bartlett emphasizes the need for philosophy to evolve to the point where the discipline can supply noncontroversial, determinate, provable solutions to philosophical problems. He supports a rigorously scientific approach to philosophy, one that can establish conclusive results that cannot coherently be evaded or denied. In this first stage of the book, Bartlett identifies a group of psychological blocks or shortcomings found among many philosophers that stand in the way of the discipline's ability to reach indisputable conclusions. For readers not interested in considering the psychological profile characteristic of many philosophers both in the past and today, Bartlett suggests that the first two psychologically-focused chapters of the book can be skipped without loss of the book's main content.

The second principal stage in the book's development contains the technical, substantive core of Bartlett's approach (Part II: The Metalogic of Reference: A New Approach to Deductive, Transcendental Philosophy). Here, Bartlett formulates step-by-step in a series of 13 chapters the methodology that makes it possible to identify, correct, and eliminate the widespread form of conceptual error with which the book is concerned. This central portion of the book formulates a "self-validating" method, one which cannot be rejected without undermining the very possibility of reference and meaning. This part of the book defines an approach to conceptual analysis that makes it possible to recognize the "metalogical horizons" beyond which it is impossible to go without incurring the special variety of "projective" self-referential incoherence which Bartlett was the first to identify, name, and analyze in his 1970 doctoral dissertation.

The third main stage of analysis in the Critique of Impure Reason (Part III: Philosophical Applications of the Metalogic of Reference: Major Problems and Questions of Philosophy and the Philosophy of Science) applies the so-called "de-projective method," developed in Part II, to a wide range of major problems of philosophy, including problems of ontology; the problem of the external world; the problem of other minds; the problems of realism and idealism; the problem of time, space, space-time and causality; the problem of the self and of solipsism; as well as others. Part III culminates in three chapters that apply the de-projective method to relativity physics and quantum theory. Bartlett's aim in these latter chapters is to show that the results reached by the Critique of Impure Reason confirm or support in a number of important ways many of the same results reached by theoretical physicists in both relativity theory and quantum theory.

The book concludes with Part IV: Horizons, which contains two chapters. The first urges a rigorous, scientific approach in philosophy that goes beyond the mere beliefs that have defined traditional philosophy, and the second summarizes the principal results the long study has reached.

The contents of the Critique of Impure Reason
The following is an abbreviated table of contents of the Critique of Impure Reason; for conciseness, sections and sub-sections of individual chapters are not listed here:

ABBREVIATED TABLE OF CONTENTS

 Preface
 Foreword by Carl Friedrich von Weizsäcker
 Acknowledgments
 Avant-propos: A philosopher's rallying call
 Introduction
 A note to the reader
 A note on conventions

 PART I
 WHY PHILOSOPHY HAS MADE NO PROGRESS AND HOW IT CAN
 1  Philosophical-psychological prelude
 2  Putting belief in its place: Its psychology and a needed polemic
 3  Turning away from the linguistic turn: From theory of reference to metalogic of reference
 4  The stepladder to maximum theoretical generality

 PART II
 THE METALOGIC OF REFERENCE: A New Approach to Deductive, Transcendental Philosophy
 5  Reference, identity, and identification
 6  Self-referential argument and the metalogic of reference
 7  Possibility theory
 8  Presupposition logic, reference, and identification
 9  Transcendental argumentation and the metalogic of reference
 10  Framework relativity
 11  The metalogic of meaning
 12  The problem of putative meaning and the logic of meaninglessness
 13  Projection
 14  Horizons
 15  De-projection
 16  Self-validation
 17  Rationality: Rules of admissibility

 PART III
 PHILOSOPHICAL APPLICATIONS OF THE METALOGIC OF REFERENCE: Major Problems and Questions of Philosophy and the Philosophy of Science
 18  Ontology and the metalogic of reference
 19  Discovery or invention in general problem-solving, mathematics, and physics
 20  The conceptually unreachable: "The far side"
 21  The projections of the external world, things-in-themselves, other minds, realism, and idealism
 22  The projections of time, space, and space-time
 23  The projections of causality, determinism, and free will
 24  Projections of the self and of solipsism
 25  Non-relational, agentless reference and referential fields
 26  Relativity physics as seen through the lens of the metalogic of reference
 27  Quantum theory as seen through the lens of the metalogic of reference
 28  Epistemological lessons learned from and applicable to relativity physics and quantum theory

 PART IV:
 HORIZONS
 29  Beyond belief
 30  Critique of Impure Reason: Its results in retrospect

 SUPPLEMENT
 The Formal Structure of the Metalogic of Reference

 APPENDIX I
 The Concept of Horizon in the Work of Other Philosophers

 APPENDIX II
 Epistemological Intelligence

 References
 Index
 About the author

How the Critique of Impure Reason demonstrates or proves its claims
Central to the book's technique of analysis is Bartlett's "method of de-projection." Briefly stated, the method is designed to bring to light the "metalogical presuppositions" entailed by any frame of reference if that frame of reference is to be capable, in principle, of identifying the class of objects for which the framework is intended. "Metalogical presuppositions" are those that cannot be denied or rejected without undermining the very possibility of reference to that class of objects. This approach to philosophical analysis is characterized by Bartlett's original conception and approach to transcendental argumentation, which has a long history, most notably dating back to Kant. In this tradition, and briefly stated, a transcendental argument is one which seeks to demonstrate the necessary "preconditions" without which a thesis or position or claim to knowledge would be rendered impossible.

Once the metalogical presuppositions of a frame of reference have been identified, Bartlett's method of de-projection comes into play whenever any concept or claim involves an assertion about a set of objects that they possess an autonomy or are separable from the frame of reference permitting their identification. Such concepts or claims are then recognized as attempted transgressions of the inescapable "metalogical horizon" of that framework of reference. The Critique of Impure Reason claims to demonstrate that such assertions of autonomy or separability are "metalogically projective"—that is, such assertions undermine their own possibility of reference and hence their own possibility of meaning.

Throughout the main body of the treatise, this method of analysis is applied in a large variety of philosophical contexts, to many of the major problems and questions that have concerned philosophers for centuries. The Critique of Impure Reason seeks to show that a great many major philosophical problems can conclusively be solved in this way.

The philosophical purpose of the Critique of Impure Reason
The Critique of Impure Reason: Horizons of Possibility and Meaning claims to break new ground in philosophy in the following ways: The book systematically analyzes one major philosophical problem after another, and in each case offers solutions designed to avoid horizon-trespassing, meaningless-entailing attempts to go beyond what can coherently and rationally be thought or expressed. The book then describes how many philosophical problems and the concepts they presuppose can be understood in non-projective ways that do not lead to self-undermining incoherence. In this way, the book proposes a new and revisionary philosophical understanding.

In more specific terms, the philosophical purpose of Critique of Impure Reason is made clear by the volume's systematic development in individual chapters of a general theory of possibility (Chapter 7), a broad-spectrum theory of presuppositions (Chapter 8), an inclusive theory of meaning (Chapter 11), and, key to the book's analytical method, a general theory of frameworks and of reference (esp. Chapters 5 and 10).

The book's cover states that the book provides "a revolutionary paradigm shift in philosophical thought." Bartlett explains that such a shift in philosophical thinking comes about once philosophers realize that many of the principal concepts they rely upon—concepts that are presupposed by the major problems which have occupied traditional philosophy—are self-undermining on the level of their possible meaningfulness. If the book is successful in justifying this claim, then the Critique of Impure Reason would be revolutionary for the discipline of philosophy, for then much that has occupied philosophers over millennia would be reinterpreted in a fundamentally revisionary way. The book's critique would then be justified in asserting that a great many of the questions of philosophy fall under the heading of impure reason, violating the conditions that must be granted for them to possess possible meaning.

The Critique of Impure Reason is a work with a wide philosophical scope, applying a systematically developed method of analysis to many major problems that have engaged philosophers. The treatise of nearly 900 pages and more than 303,000 words is a thoroughgoing work of scholarship with references to more than 600 individual publications, and containing more than 400 explanatory notes.

Recognition of Bartlett's work in philosophy and commendations of the Critique of Impure Reason
Bartlett's work in philosophy has received widespread recognition. In addition to the publication of more than 20 books, edited collections, research monographs, and many papers in professional journals, his research has been funded under grants by the National Science Foundation, the Max-Planck-Gesellschaft, the Alliance Française, the RAND Corporation, the Center for the Study of Democratic Institutions, the American Association for the Advancement of Science, the Lilly Endowment, and others.

The Critique of Impure Reason has received strong commendations from leading philosophers:

 German philosopher and physicist Carl Friedrich von Weizsäcker, former Director of the Max-Planck-Institut in Starnberg, Germany, contributed the book's Foreword, saying of Bartlett's project: "I consider Dr. Bartlett's work soundly conceived and executed with great skill."
 American philosopher Nicholas Rescher, Distinguished University Professor of Philosophy at the University of Pittsburgh and author of more than 100 books, commends the Critique of Impure Reason'''s wide scope of study: "I admire its range of philosophical vision."
 German philosopher and sociologist Gerhard Preyer, Professor of Philosophy at Goethe-University, Frankfurt am Main, Germany, the author of many books including Concepts of Meaning, Beyond Semantics and Pragmatics, Intention and Practical Thought, and Contextualism in Philosophy, writes of Bartlett's Critique of Impure Reason: "Bartlett's Critique of Impure Reason is an impressive, bold, and ambitious work. Careful scholarship is balanced by original analyses that lead the reader to recognize the limits of meaning, knowledge, and conceptual possibility. The work addresses a host of traditional philosophical problems, among them the nature of space, time, causality, consciousness, the self, other minds, ontology, free will and determinism, and others. The book culminates in a fascinating and profound new understanding of relativity physics and quantum theory."
 American philosopher Martin X. Moleski is the author with William Taussig Scott of the only biography of Michael Polanyi to be authorized by Polanyi himself, Michael Polanyi: Scientist and Philosopher, and is a researcher of scientific method, the presuppositions of thought, and the self-referential nature of epistemology. Moleski commends Bartlett's Critique of Impure Reason: "Bartlett has written an American "Prolegomena to All Future Metaphysics." He aims rigorously to eliminate meaningless assertions, reach bedrock, and place philosophy on a firm foundation that will enable it, like science and mathematics, to produce lasting results that generations to come can build on. This is a great book, the fruit of a lifetime of research and reflection, and it deserves serious attention."
 American philosopher and computer scientist Don Perlis, Professor of Computer Science, University of Maryland, and the author of many publications on self-adjusting autonomous systems and philosophical issues involving self-reference, mind, and consciousness, says of Bartlett's Critique of Impure Reason: "Bartlett has written a book on what might be called the underpinnings of philosophy. It has fascinating depth and breadth, and is all the more striking due to its unifying perspective based on the concepts of reference and self-reference."

References

External links and resources

Books, monographs, and papers by Steven James Bartlett available online
 A Relativistic Theory of Phenomenological Constitution: A Self-referential, Transcendental Approach to Conceptual Pathology. Doctoral dissertation, Université de Paris, 2 vols., 834 pages: Vol. I in French, and Vol. II in English.
 VALIDITY: A Learning Game Approach to Mathematical Logic. An academic learning game for use in university-level classes in mathematical logic, including both propositional and predicate calculi.
 "Phenomenology of the Implicit". Describes the author's transition from phenomenology to studies of the preconditions of reference.
 "Fenomenologia Tego – Co Implikowane". A Polish translation of the author's "Phenomenology of the Implicit." 
 Conceptual Therapy: An Introduction to Framework-relative Epistemology. An introductory college text applying Bartlett's self-validating approach to conceptual analysis.
 Reflexivity: A Source Book in Self-Reference. An edited collection of 33 papers by authors who have contributed to this area of study, including Fitch, Smullyan, Prior, Rescher, van Fraassen, Johnstone, Boyle, Bartlett, and others.
 "Narcissism and Philosophy". This paper examines the personality of many philosophers in terms of psychological narcissism, and argues that, as a result, narcissism characterizes many of the positions that philosophers propound.
 "Philosophy as Ideology". Examines philosophical positions as exemplifying the defining characteristics of ideology.
 "Psychological Underpinnings of Philosophy". Describes the psychological profile of many philosophers.
 "The Problem of Psychotherapeutic Effectiveness". A paper describing the main determinants of the effectiveness of psychotherapy.
 "Roots of Human Resistance to Animal Rights: Psychological and Conceptual Blocks". A paper examining a variety of blocks that originate in human psychology and in human ways of thinking, blocks that obstruct our recognition of and respect for both the individual consciousness and the legal rights of non-human animals.
 "Raízes da resistência humana aos direitos dos animais: Bloqueios psicológicos e conceituais.". A translation into Portuguese of the preceding paper.
 "Wurzeln menschlichen Widerstands gegen Tierrechte: Psychologische und konceptuelle Blockaden." A translation into German of Bartlett's "Roots of Human Resistance to Animal Rights: Psychological and Conceptual Blocks."
 When You Don't Know Where to Turn: A Self-diagnosing Guide to Counseling and Therapy: eBook from Project Gutenberg. Presents an algorithm to aid people in identifying approaches to counseling or therapy likely to be most helpful to them.
 "The Idea of a Metalogic of Reference". An informal introduction to the approach central to Bartlett's epistemology.
 "Referential Consistency as a Criterion of Meaning". In this paper, Bartlett formulates what he calls a "self-validating" criterion of meaning. By this he means a necessary, but not a sufficient, condition of meaning that is logically compelling in the sense that this criterion of meaning cannot not be accepted without bringing about a form of self-referential consistency that undermines the very possibility of meaning. Bartlett argues that this "metalogical" variety of self-referential inconsistency comprises a new and distinct kind of self-referential inconsistency, to be distinguished from the philosophically familiar varieties of semantical and pragmatical self-referential inconsistency.
 "The Role of Reflexivity in Understanding Human Understanding". "Introduction" from Steven James Bartlett (Ed.), Reflexivity: A Source-Book in Self-Reference, pp. 3–18.
 The Species Problem: Inescapable Ambiguity and Redundancy. Open access monograph available from ArXiv.org, CogPrints, HAL (Centre pour la Communication Scientifique Directe), and PhilSci. In Bartlett's monograph, the "species problem" refers to past efforts, principally by biologists, to define definitively and objectively what the concept of "species" means. Bartlett seeks to demonstrate two central assertions about the species problem: First, he claims that past efforts to define in any compelling way what "species" means have been unsuccessful because they have failed to understand the theoretical impossibility of the task. It is theoretically impossible, he argues, to define in any compelling way what "species" means due to what he calls "the inescapable ambiguity" that is ingredient in the very attempt to reach such a definition. Second, he claims that the solution to the species problem requires what he calls a "framework-relative" approach to species definition. The monograph seeks to demonstrate that such an approach is logically compelling in the sense that it cannot not be accepted without inconsistency.
 "The Case for Government by Artificial Intelligence". A critical and speculative essay, briefly reviewing Bartlett's previous book-length studies relating to shortcomings of psychological normality, and discussing their possible remediation through government by artificial intelligence.
 "Paratheism: A Proof That God Neither Exists nor Does Not Exist". Bartlett argues that theism, atheism, and agnosticism are all fundamentally incoherent from the standpoint of a logical, epistemological analysis. He formulates a proof that theism, atheism, and agnosticism are equally unacceptable because each is "conceptually self-undermining" and therefore incoherent.
 Epistemological Intelligence. An open access monograph available from HAL (Centre pour la Communication Scientifique Directe) and PhilPapers. In this monograph, Bartlett develops the concept of "epistemological intelligence," which he introduces and develops as a new distinguishable variety of human intelligence. He reports his observations of the psychology of philosophers, and claims that the commonly prevailing psychological profile of philosophers often stands in the way of their ability to develop the skills that define epistemological intelligence. A revised version of Epistemological Intelligence appears in Critique of Impure Reason, Appendix II.
 "Mismeasuring Our Lives: The Case against Usefulness, Popularity, and the Desire to Influence Others". In this paper, Bartlett examines what he claims are three important and unquestioned presumptions that fundamentally influence contemporary society, our educational system, and the professions. These presumptions are: the high value that is placed on usefulness, on striving for popularity, and on the wish to influence other people. He presents the case against these presumptions which he claims impede the development of human culture. 
 "The Objectivity of Truth, Morality, and Beauty". In this essay, Bartlett advances an innovative approach to answer the perennial question whether truth, morality, and beauty have an objective basis. The essay seeks to show how it is possible to associate three varieties of human intelligence—cognitive intelligence, "moral intelligence," and "aesthetic intelligence"—with justifiable objective judgments about truth, morality, and beauty.
 "America's Upside-down Doctrine of Education: Albert Jay Nock's Theory of What Has Gone Wrong — Or Is It Right?". The American system of education makes important and sometimes unjustified assumptions that were questioned and criticized nearly a hundred years ago by author and educational theorist Albert Jay Nock. This essay discusses Nock’s theory of education and finds that certain of the assumptions made by American education stand sorely in need of the support of evidence.
 "An Insult to the Reader and to Society: Milton’s View", reflections on the unproductive constraints imposed by peer review, with a retrospective discussion of John Milton’s view. Also available from Cogprints. 
 " The Case against the Conventional Publication of Academic and Scientific Books". Bartlett weighs some of the pros and cons of academic and scientific book publishing, and argues on behalf of open access publishing.
 "A Code of Conduct for Peer Reviewers and Editors". In the past few decades, peer review has come to dominate virtually all professionally respectable academic and scientific publications. However, despite its near-universal acceptance, no code of conduct has been developed to which peer reviewers and their editors are encouraged to adhere. This paper proposes such a code of conduct.

Additional online resources
 A variety of books and papers by Steven James Bartlett; some are abstracted while many others are available in their entirety through PhilPapers and Social Science Research Network (SSRN).
 Official website (at Willamette University): A selection of Bartlett's downloadable books, papers, and related commentary and discussion.
 
 
 Stanford Encyclopedia of Philosophy article Epistemology by Matthias Steup.
 Internet Encyclopedia of Philosophy article 
 Encyclopedia Britannica'' article Epistemology by Avrum Stroll and A.P. Martinich

2021 non-fiction books
Philosophy books
Epistemological theories
Philosophy of science
Epistemology of science
Self-reference
Meaning (philosophy of language)
Philosophy of logic